Pennsylvania Route 653 (PA 653) is a  state highway in Fayette and Somerset counties in Pennsylvania, United States. The western terminus is at PA 381 in Springfield Township.  The eastern terminus is at Mason Dixon Highway (former U.S. Route 219 or US 219) in Garrett.

Route description

PA 653 begins at an intersection with PA 381 in Springfield Township, Fayette County, heading east on two-lane undivided Jim Mount Road. The road passes through a mix of farmland and woodland before turning southeast into wooded areas, crossing Indian Creek. The route runs through more woodland with a few farm fields, turning east and heading into forested areas of Laurel Ridge State Park.

PA 653 enters Upper Turkeyfoot Township in Somerset County and becomes Scullton Road, passing through more woodland with some farmland and homes, turning to the southeast. The road heads through wooded areas of housing development before heading into a mix of farms and woods with some residences, passing through Scullton and crossing into Middlecreek Township. The route winds east through more rural areas, crossing the Laurel Hill Creek and heading into open agricultural areas, intersecting PA 281 in the residential community of New Lexington. At this point, PA 281 turns east to form a concurrency with PA 653, passing through more farmland on Kingwood Road. The road heads into wooded areas, crossing the Middle Creek into Milford Township and turning northeast. The two routes head into more agricultural land and cross into the borough of New Centerville, passing homes. PA 653 splits from PA 281 by turning south onto Bridge Street and running through more residential areas. The road crosses back into Milford Township and heads southeast through open farmland with some woods and homes. The route enters the borough of Rockwood and heads into residential areas, turning south. PA 653 turns east onto Main Street and passes more homes along with a few businesses, turning northeast. The route heads back into Milford Township and turns east onto Galico Road, with Main Street continuing north. PA 653 crosses Coxes Creek into Black Township and crosses over CSX's S&C Subdivision railroad line, heading southeast through wooded areas with some homes before turning northeast through open farmland. The route turns southeast onto Garrett Road, running through more open agricultural areas with some homes. PA 653 continues into a mix of farmland and woodland with some residences, crossing into Summit Township. Farther southeast, the road heads through more wooded areas, curving south into the borough of Garrett and becoming Jackson Street. PA 653 curves to the southeast through areas of homes and businesses, ending at an intersection with Mason Dixon Highway / SR 2047 (former US 219).

Major intersections

PA 653 Truck

Pennsylvania Route 653 Truck was a  truck route east of Rockwood. The highway was created to bypass a bridge over Coxes Creek. Although the structure was replaced in 1999, the route remained signed until 2011. The road deviated from its parent by heading north along Water Level Road. The route made a turn southeast and then crossed the creek before rejoining PA 653 after travelling along SR 3019.

See also

References

External links

 Pennsylvania Highways: PA 653

653
Transportation in Fayette County, Pennsylvania
Transportation in Somerset County, Pennsylvania